Sant Llorenç Savall is a municipality of the comarca of Vallès Occidental, in Catalonia.

Churches
 
Sant Jaume de Vallverd

References

External links
 Government data pages 

Municipalities in Vallès Occidental